Alroy Road Tracks is an extended play credited to "The Duke Of Harringay", an alias for Squarepusher. It was released on 12" vinyl format only, the second release on the Spymania label. All tracks were later released on the Squarepusher compilation Burningn'n Tree.

Track listing
Side A
"Central Line" - 3:57
"Sarcacid Part 1" - 5:56
"Sarcacid Part 2" - 5:05
Side B
"Nux Vomica" - 7:57
"Toast For Hardy" - 9:23

References
Discogs entry

1995 albums
Squarepusher albums